Supreme Electoral Court may refer to:

 Superior Electoral Court of Brazil
 Supreme Electoral Court of Costa Rica
 Supreme Electoral Court (El Salvador)

See also
 Supreme Electoral Tribunal (disambiguation)